Frederick Oliver Trench, 3rd Baron Ashtown (2 February 1868 – 20 March 1946) was an Anglo-Irish landowner and opponent of the United Irish League.

Frederick Oliver Trench was the eldest son of Frederick Sydney Charles Trench (heir apparent to the 2nd Lord Ashtown) and Anne Le Poer Trench (eldest daughter of the 3rd Earl of Clancarty of Garbally). At the age of twelve, he became the 3rd Baron Ashtown and inherited a vast estate and reputedly over a million pounds. Some of his County Galway estate was located in Killimordaly. According to valuation records he was landlord for the following townlands: Caraunbeg, Caraunmore, Creevagh, Dooghloon, Gortnaboha and Island.

Ashtown was educated at Eton College. On 11 January 1894, he married Violet Grace Cosby, the youngest daughter of Col. Robert Ashworth Godolphin Cosby of Stradbally Hall, Queen's County.  Ashtown was a hard-line Unionist; in 1906-10 he edited a monthly publication, Grievances from Ireland, which denounced all political expressions of Irish nationalism as treasonable. His hunting lodge at Ballymacarbry, County Waterford, was damaged by bombs and arson in 1907 and destroyed by the Irish Republican Army during the War of Independence.

He was elected an Irish representative peer in 1908. He died in 1946.

References 
 Kieran Jordan (ed.), Kiltullagh Killimordaly As the Centuries Passed: A History from 1500-1900, Kiltullagh/Killimordaly Historical Society (2000), 

1868 births
1946 deaths
Frederick 3
Politicians from County Galway
People educated at Eton College
Irish representative peers
Frederick